Charles Anthony Swainson (1820–1887) was an English theologian, Principal of Chichester Theological College, Norris–Hulse Professor of Divinity, and subsequently Lady Margaret's Professor of Divinity, Master of Christ's College, Cambridge and a canon of Chichester.  His published works deal mainly with the Eastern liturgies and the creeds.

Life
He was the second son of Anthony Swainson of Liverpool, a merchant and brother of Charles Swainson of Preston. He was educated at the Royal Institution of Liverpool's school, and matriculated at Trinity College, Cambridge in 1837, graduating B.A. in 1841, M.A. in 1844, and D.D. in 1864.

Works 
 The Greek liturgies chiefly from original authorities (Cambridge, 1884)
Several of his works have been reproduced by Project Canterbury (May 2013).

Notes

References 

 ODNB

External links
 

1820 births
1887 deaths
English theologians
Masters of Christ's College, Cambridge
Vice-Chancellors of the University of Cambridge
Norrisian Professors of Divinity
Lady Margaret's Professors of Divinity